Macrostructure may refer to:

Macrostructure (linguistics)
Macrostructure (psychology)
Macrostructure (sociology)

See also
Microstructure